Neurogenic locus notch homolog 4 (Notch 4) is a protein that in humans is encoded by the NOTCH4 gene located on chromosome 6.

Gene 
An alternative splice variant of the NOTCH4 gene has been described, but its biological significance has not been determined.

Structure 
The neurogenic locus notch homolog 4 protein is a member of the Notch family. Members of this type 1 transmembrane protein family share structural characteristics. These include an extracellular domain consisting of multiple epidermal growth factor-like (EGF) repeats, and an intracellular domain that consists of multiple, but different, domain types.

Function 
Notch protein family members play a role in a variety of developmental processes by controlling cell fate decisions. The Notch signaling pathway is an evolutionarily conserved intercellular signaling pathway that regulates interactions between physically adjacent cells

In Drosophila, notch interacts with its cell-bound ligands (delta and serrate), and establishes an intercellular signaling pathway that then plays a key role in development. Homologues of the notch-ligands have also been identified in humans, but precise interactions between these ligands and the human notch homologues remain to be determined. The notch protein is cleaved in the trans-Golgi network, and then presented on the cell surface as a heterodimer. The protein functions as a receptor for membrane bound ligands, and may play a role in vascular, renal, and hepatic development.

Clinical significance 
Mutations in the notch4 gene may be associated with susceptibility to schizophrenia in a small portion of cases.

References

Further reading